Wind power in Tennessee has most potential in East Tennessee along the North Carolina border. The state has not passed renewable portfolio standard legislation and there is just one utility-scale wind farm with 15 operating turbines and previously 3 test turbines. The Tennessee Valley Authority (TVA), based in Knoxville, imports wind-generated electricity into its service area which includes Tennessee. US Senator Lamar Alexander from Tennessee is an outspoken critic of wind power.

Buffalo Mountain

Located north of Oak Ridge and Oliver Springs, and east of Frozen Head State Park about thirty miles northwest of Knoxville, Buffalo Mountain Wind Farm was built in 2000 by the Tennessee Valley Authority (TVA). 

Before expanding the wind plant at Buffalo Mountain, TVA proposed fourteen wind turbines on a ridge north of  Beech Mountain, within 11 miles of the Appalachian Trail.

Until 2009 the TVA operated three wind turbines with a combined generation capacity of 2 MW "as a test bed". TVA stopped operating the three turbines in 2009 due to maintenance issues. In 2021 TVA announced no access would be allowed in the area while it is removing the three original test wind turbines that  "reached their end of life." It purchases the output of 15 wind turbines built in 2004 and owned by Invenergy that have a combined capacity of 27 MW.

TVA import
The Tennessee Valley Authority service area covers most of Tennessee, portions of Alabama, Mississippi, and Kentucky, and small sections of Georgia, North Carolina, and Virginia. As of 2013, the agency had power purchased agreements with wind farms outside its service area:
2012 - Enel Green Power, LLC - 201MW - Caney River Wind Farm, Elk County, Kansas.
2012- Invenergy - 400MW - Bishop Hill Wind Energy Center, Henry County, Illinois 200 megawatts generated by General Electric 1.5-megawatt SLE turbines.  This facility began delivery in July 2012.
2012- Invenergy - 200MW - California Ridge Wind Energy Center in Champaign County, Illinois  
2012- NextEra Energy Resources - 150MW - White Oak Energy Center, McLean County, Illinois 
2012- NextEra Energy Resources- 165MW - Cimarron Wind farm, Gray County, Kansas 
 
A 2010 agreement with Iberdrola Renewables provides a potential 300MW future supply from Streator-Cayuga Ridge Wind Farm, Livingston County, Illinois

Clean Line Energy transmission
Clean Line Energy LLC is proposing 700-mile power transmission line to bring wind energy from Oklahoma and to the Tennessee Valley. The TVA would import 1,750 megawatts, about half of the power that could be transmitted. Developers began in 2007 to seek regulatory approval for the $2 billion project, but the approvals needed to start construction aren't expected to be in place until at least 2020. The project faces opposition, particularly in Arkansas.

Statistics

See also

Solar power in Tennessee
Wind power in the United States
Renewable energy in the United States

References

External links

ASSESSMENT OF BAT MORTALITY AND ACTIVITY AT BUFFALO MOUNTAIN WINDFARM, EASTERN TENNESSEE
WINDExchange Department of Energy's Wind Program Office of Energy Efficiency & Renewable Energy Resources in Tennessee
Small Wind Electric Systems Department of Energy
Renewable energy in Tennessee 2013